Momodou Lamin Drammeh (born 26 October 1978) is a Gambian sprinter. He competed in the men's 4 × 400 metres relay at the 1996 Summer Olympics.

References

1978 births
Living people
Athletes (track and field) at the 1996 Summer Olympics
Gambian male sprinters
Olympic athletes of the Gambia
Place of birth missing (living people)